Guilty Hearts is an omnibus drama film consisting of six short stories. It is directed by George Gargurevich, Krystoff Pizykucki, Paul Black, Phil Dornfield, Ravi Kumar, and Savina Dellicour, and written by George Augusto. One source gives Gargurevich as Augusto and also includes director Benjamin Ross.

Charlie Sheen and Anna Faris star in the episode "Spelling Bee"; Eva Mendes in "Outskirts"; Julie Delpy in "Notting Hill Anxiety Festival"; Stellan Skarsgård in "Torte Bluma"; Kathy Bates in "The Ingrate"; and  Imelda Staunton in "Ready".

It was produced by Dominic Norris, Josie Law, Peter Soldinger, and Stephen Sacks.

Cast
Source unless otherwise noted:

Home Release
It was released on DVD in the U.S. by Phase 4 Films on June 28, 2011.

References

External links
 

2011 films
American drama films
2011 drama films
2010s English-language films
2010s American films